Infinity Within is the second studio album by American house and club/dance group Deee-Lite. Released in 1992 on Elektra, the second album, through its lyrical content, instrumentation, and overall tone, showcases the band's political activism as a more literal part of the music than on their debut album, World Clique (1990).

"Runaway", the lead single from the album, is Deee-Lite's fourth single to top the Billboard dance chart, helping to establish their success in the musical genre beyond World Clique.

Album description
With its predecessor subtly focusing on global peace, joy, and unity, Infinity Within is overtly political, as evidenced by the phrase "Let's face it, it's a pro-choice album" appearing on the album cover and more importantly, with outspoken tracks encouraging the protection of the environment ("I Had a Dream I Was Falling through a Hole in the Ozone Layer"), sexual liberation through safe sex ("Rubber Lover"), the failure of the judicial system ("Fuddy Duddy Judge") and the importance of voting ("Vote, Baby, Vote"). The song "Vote, Baby, Vote" was made into a public service announcement which advocated the band's mission for voter registration and their support of the Motor Voter Bill to ease voter registration.

While some music critics may not have recognized it, the move to more heightened social awareness on the second album was not a departure from World Clique, but a natural progression for the band members. Inspired by the I Ching, Infinity Within is meant to be more self-reflective and to counteract the global view of World Clique, which lead singer Lady Kier felt was often misunderstood. She explained the idea behind the album and its title by saying: 

To further show their support of the environment, Deee-Lite pledged a portion of the album's profits to Greenpeace. Additionally, Infinity Within was the first Warner Music titles that was issued in an eco-friendly package called the Eco-pak. It was designed in 1991 by Ivy Hill Packaging, at the time a subsidiary of Time Warner, as a more environmentally friendly alternative to the longbox which was often discarded after purchase, and to facilitate proper display of CDs in music retail stores. The eco-pack was displayed in stores unfolded, to display titles in the same manner as longboxes. Upon purchasing a title and removing the plastic shrink wrap, the packaging was folded into the shape of a traditional CD jewel case, similar to a Digipak. By 1993, the use of the longbox was phased out as music retailers began replacing LP-sized sales racks with those to house jewelcase or digipak formats with the locking plastic frames (keepers); thus rendering the Eco-pak, in its original form, obsolete. As a result, Infinity Within is among the few titles ever released with the original Eco-pak design.

Reception

The album generally received mixed reviews. Despite a lukewarm response, Robert Christgau gave the album a very positive 3-star honorable mention. 

Joe Brown from The Washington Post wrote, "Out to prove they're not just cartoon characters or paper dolls, the retro-Hollywood styled Lady Miss Kier Kirby, Super DJ Dmitry Brill and Jungle DJ Towa "Towa" Tei try for some substance with their style this time out, interlacing the strained zaniness with messages ("Let's face it! It's a pro-choice album!" says the cover). Their concerns are similar to those of the B-52's: safer sex, environmental destruction, voter registration and extraterrestrial contacts. As for the music, recycling is the order of the day - while there's nothing as instantly infectious as "Groove is in the Heart", the band's blend of house Lite, R&B and eclectic sampling is more consistent, and the deceptively slight melodic hooks of "Runaway" and "Heart Be Still" prove infuriatingly tenacious. Kier has developed into a more confident, relaxed singer, and the DJs (plus cameos by bassist Bootsy Collins, hot rap outfit Arrested Development and several ex-JBs) provide perfect music for runway walking or Stairmaster stepping."

Singles
Infinity Within yielded three commercial singles the year of its release. The first single, "Runaway", was released onto CD, cassette, and 12" vinyl in May 1992, three weeks prior to the album's debut. "Runaway" went on to top the Billboard Dance chart, making it Deee-Lite's fourth song to reach #1 on that chart. The commercial release of "Runaway", which was paired with the song "Rubber Lover", went on to top the Billboard Hot Dance Music/Maxi-Single Sales chart as well. The single was accompanied by a music video directed by Gus Van Sant, which received modest airplay from MTV. "Runaway" is the only single from Infinity Within for which a music video was produced.

"Thank You Everyday", the second single from the album, was released onto CD and 12" vinyl in September 1992. The single failed to chart. The third and final single from the album, "Pussycat Meow", was released solely onto 12" vinyl in November 1992. The single climbed to #6 on the Billboard Dance charts and #26 on the Billboard Dance Sales charts. A promotional CD single of "I Had a Dream I was Falling Through a Hole in the Ozone Layer" was released, but no commercial single was.

Aside from the success of "Runaway" on the dance chart, overall the three singles did not have as much impact as those released from World Clique. As such, none of the singles from Infinity Within managed to chart on the Billboard Hot 100.

Track listing

All songs written by Deee-Lite, except:
#1, co-written by Arrested Development,
6, co-written by Jamal-Ski, and
9, co-written by Michael Franti and Danny Madden.

Chart performance

Personnel

Deee-Lite
Lady Kier Kirby – vocals
Super DJ Dmitry Brill – guitar, keyboards, bass, drum programming, loop scooping, piano
Towa Tei – keyboards, bass, drum programming, loop scooping

Additional personnel
Bernie Worrell – clavinet (on track 3), clavinet and piano (8), synthesizer (9), melodica (14)
Satoshi Tomiie – keyboards (11, 13)
Bootsy Collins – guitar (3, 4, 6, 8, 9, 11, 12, 14), bass (3, 10, 12, 14), backing vocals (12)
Catfish Collins – guitar (14)
Robin Lobe – percussion (3, 13)
Misha Masud – tabla (14)
Maceo Parker – saxophone (3, 4, 6, 8, 9), flute (13)
Fred Wesley – trombone (3, 4, 6, 8, 9) 
Gary Mudbone Cooper, Danny Madden, Sahirah Moore, Sheila Slappy, Zhana Saunders – backing vocals
Arrested Development – rap (1), African chant (13)
Jamal-Ski (6), Michael Franti (9) – rap

Production
Deee-Lite - arranger, mixing, producer
Fernando Aponte - assistant engineer	
Shannon Carr - assistant engineer
Dennis Mitchell - digital editing
Dante de Sole - assistant engineer
Rob Kempner - assistant engineer
Lady Miss Kier - design 
Michael F. Mills - art direction, package design
John Parthum - assistant engineer
Nick Phillips - artwork
Mark Plati - engineer
Herb Powers - mastering
Mike Rogers - mixing
Dana Vlcek - assistant engineer

References

Deee-Lite albums
1992 albums
Elektra Records albums